Herrick Township is the name of some places in the U.S. state of Pennsylvania:
Herrick Township, Bradford County, Pennsylvania
Herrick Township, Susquehanna County, Pennsylvania

Pennsylvania township disambiguation pages